Electra, Elektra, or The Electra (Ēlektra) is a Greek tragedy by Sophocles. Its date is not known, but various stylistic similarities with the Philoctetes (409 BC) and the Oedipus at Colonus (401 BC) lead scholars to suppose that it was written towards the end of Sophocles' career.  Jebb dates it between 420 BC and 414 BC. 

Set in the city of Argos a few years after the Trojan War, the play tells of a bitter struggle for justice by Electra and her brother Orestes for the murder of their father Agamemnon by Clytemnestra and their stepfather Aegisthus.

When King Agamemnon returns from the Trojan War, his wife Clytemnestra (who has taken Agamemnon's cousin Aegisthus as a lover) kills him.  Clytemnestra believes the murder was justified, since Agamemnon had sacrificed their daughter Iphigenia before the war, as commanded by the gods. Electra, daughter of Agamemnon and Clytemnestra, rescued her younger brother Orestes from her mother by sending him to Strophius of Phocis. The play begins years later when Orestes has returned as a grown man with a plot for revenge, as well as to claim the throne.

Storyline

Orestes arrives with his friend Pylades, son of Strophius, and a pedagogue, i.e. tutor (an old attendant of Orestes, who took him from Electra to Strophius).  Their plan is to have the tutor announce that Orestes has died in a chariot race, and that two men (really Orestes and Pylades) are arriving shortly to deliver an urn with his remains. Meanwhile, Electra continues to mourn the death of her father Agamemnon, holding her mother Clytemnestra responsible for his murder. When Electra is told of the death of Orestes her grief is doubled, but is to be short-lived.

After a choral ode, Orestes arrives carrying the urn supposedly containing his ashes. He does not recognize Electra, nor she him. He gives her the urn and she delivers a moving lament over it, unaware that her brother is in fact standing alive next to her. Now realizing the truth, Orestes reveals his identity to his emotional sister. She is overjoyed that he is alive, but in their excitement they nearly reveal his identity, and the tutor comes out from the palace to urge them on. Orestes and Pylades enter the house and slay Clytemnestra. As Aegisthus returns home, they quickly put her corpse under a sheet and present it to him as the body of Orestes. He lifts the veil to discover who it really is, and Orestes then reveals himself. They escort Aegisthus off set to be killed at the hearth, the same location Agamemnon was slain. The play ends here, before the death of Aegisthus is announced.

Similar works

The story of Orestes' revenge was a popular subject in Greek tragedies.
There are surviving versions by all three of the great Athenian tragedians: 
The Libation Bearers (458 BC), in the Oresteia Trilogy by Aeschylus
Electra (Euripides play), a play by Euripides, probably in the mid 410s BC, likely before 413 BC, that tells a very different version of this same basic story from Sophocles. 
Electra (Sophocles play)
 The story was also told at the end of the lost epic Nostoi (also known as Returns or Returns of the Greeks)
 The events are also brought up in Homer's Odyssey

Reception
Roman writer Cicero considered Electra to be a masterpiece, and the work is also viewed favorably among modern critics and scholars. In The Reader's Encyclopedia of World Drama, John Gassner and Edward Quinn argued that its "simple device of delaying the recognition between brother and sister produces a series of brilliant scenes which display Electra's heroic resolution under constant attack." Of the titular character, Edith Hall also wrote, "Sophocles certainly found an effective dramatic vehicle in this remarkable figure, driven by deprivation and cruelty into near-psychotic extremes of behavior; no other character in his extant dramas dominates the stage to such an extent." L.A. Post noted that the play was "unique among Greek tragedies for its emphasis on action."

Commentaries 
 Davies, Gilbert Austin, 1908 (abridged from the larger edition of Richard Claverhouse Jebb)

Translations
 Lewis Campbell, 1883 – verse
 Richard C. Jebb, 1894 – prose: full text
 Francis Storr, 1912 – verse
 Francis Fergusson, 1938 – verse
 E.F. Watling 1953 – prose
 David Grene, 1957 – verse
 H. D. F. Kitto, 1962 – verse
 J. H. Kells, 1973 – verse (?)
 Kenneth McLeish, 1979 – verse
 Frank McGuinness, 1997 – verse
 Henry Taylor, 1998 – verse
 Anne Carson, 2001 – verse
 Jenny March, 2001 – prose (acting edition)
 Tom McGrath, 2003 – prose; full text
 M. MacDonald and J. M. Walton, 2004 – verse
 G. Theodoridis, 2006 – prose: full text
 Eric Dugdale, 2008 – verse (acting edition)
 Timberlake Wertenbaker, 2009
 Nick Payne, 2011
Mary Lefkowitz, 2016 - verse
 Ian C. Johnston, 2017 – verse: full text

Adaptations 
 Elektra (play), a 1903 adaptation by Hugo von Hofmannsthal
 Elektra, Op. 58 (opera), a 1909 one-act opera by Richard Strauss
 Elektra: A Play by Ezra Pound and Rudd Fleming, written in 1949, published 1989 by Princeton University Press
 Elektra (2010 film), a 2010 Malayalam psychological drama film co-written and directed by Shyamaprasad

References

Further reading
 Duncan, A. 2005. "Gendered Interpretations: Two Fourth-Century B.C.E. Performances of Sophocles’ Electra." Helios 32.1: 55–79
 Dunn, F. M., ed. 1996. Sophocles’ Electra in Performance. Drama: Beiträge zum antiken Drama und seiner Rezeption 4. Stuttgart: M & P Verlag für Wissenschaft und Forschung.
 Griffiths, E. M. 2012. "Electra." In Brill’s Companion to Sophocles. Edited by A. Markantonatos, 73–91. Leiden, The Netherlands, and Boston: Brill.
 Ierulli, M. 1993. "A Community of Women? The Protagonist and the Chorus in Sophocles’ Electra." Métis 8:217–229.
 Lloyd, M. 2005. Sophocles: Electra. London: Duckworth.
 MacLeod, L. 2001. Dolos and Dike in Sophokles’ Elektra. Mnemosyne Supplement 219. Leiden, The Netherlands, Boston, and Cologne: Brill.
 Marshall, C. W. 2006. "How to Write a Messenger Speech (Sophocles, Electra 680–763)." In Greek Drama III: Essays in honour of Kevin Lee. Edited by J. F. Davidson, F. Muecke, and P. Wilson, 203–221. Bulletin of the Institute of Classical Studies Supplement 87. London: Institute of Classical Studies
 Nooter, S. 2011. "Language, Lamentation, and Power in Sophocles’ Electra." Classical World 104.4: 399–417.
 Segal, C. P. 1966. "The Electra of Sophocles." Transactions and Proceedings of the American Philological Association 97:473–545.
 Sommerstein, A. H. 1997. "Alternative Scenarios in Sophocles’ Electra." Prometheus 23:193–214.

External links

 
 Sophocles' Electra at Perseus Digital Library
 

Plays by Sophocles
Mythology of Argolis
Trojan War literature
Plays set in ancient Greece
Plays adapted into operas
Plays based on classical mythology